The Cryptographic Quarterly is an internal, classified journal of the U.S. National Security Agency (NSA).

In 2003, Michael Ravnitzky submitted a Freedom of Information Act (FOIA) request for an index of articles published in their Cryptographic Quarterly journal.  Three years later in 2006, the NSA declassified a number of these articles from the 1980s and 1990s. A number of these declassified documents have been made publicly available.

External links 
 NSA's Declassified Initiative
 B. Schneier's Blog
 Matt Blaze's Exhaustive Search Blog
 NSA Bibliographies provided by the TheMemoryHole.org

Quarterly journals